Crist (Old English for Christ) is the title of any of three Old English religious poems in the Exeter Book. They were during the late 9th and early 10th centuries believed to be a three-part work by a single author, but more recent scholarship has argued that the works are more likely of differing origins.

Crist I (also Crist A or Advent Lyrics), a poem in twelve sections on Christ's Advent written by an unknown author (or authors).
Crist II (also Crist B or The Ascension), a poem on Christ's Ascension written by the Anglo-Saxon poet Cynewulf.
Crist III (also Crist C), a poem on the Last Judgment written by an unknown author.

External links

 The Old English poems, Christ I-III
 A Modern English translation (PDF), by Charles W. Kennedy. From "In Parentheses".

References  

Old English poems